Kauksi Ülle (born Ülle Kahusk 23 September 1962) is an Estonian writer.

Life and work
Kauksi Ülle sees herself as a South Estonian writer who is closely connected to the customs and history of South Estonia. Therefore, according to the tradition of her homeland, she often appears under the name Kauksi Ülle. She writes consistently in Võro and is committed to reviving the language. Her work is attributed to ethnofuturism. Kauksi Ülle now lives in Obinitsa.

Kauksi Ülle grew up in the countryside in Võru County. She attended school in Rõuge and Võru. In 1986, she graduated from the University of Tartu with a degree in journalism. She then worked in the editorial department of the magazine Kultuur ja Elu, in the Tartuer Dépendance of the Estonian Writers' Union, at Võru Raadio and in the Fenno-Ugria Foundation, which she has headed since 1998.

Works

Poems
 1987 Kesk umma mäke
 1989 Hanõ vai luigõ
 1991 Jyriyy
 1995 Agu ni Eha. Morn and Eve (Võro and English)
 1996 Kuldnaanõ. Kultanainen (Võro and Finnish)
 2001 Nõsõq rõõmu mõrsija
 2003 Käänüpäiv
 2005 Emaemamaa 
 2012 Palunõiaq
 2012 Valit luulõq

Prose
 1997 Säng
 1998 Paat
 2000 Huuv'
 2003 Uibu

Drama
 2004 Taarka
 2006 Kuus tükkü

References

1962 births
Living people
People from Võru
Estonian women poets
Estonian women novelists
20th-century Estonian poets
21st-century Estonian poets
20th-century Estonian novelists
21st-century Estonian novelists
Estonian dramatists and playwrights
21st-century Estonian women writers
20th-century Estonian women writers
Recipients of the Order of the White Star, 4th Class